Darija Jurak and Anastasia Rodionova were the defending champions, but lost in the first round to Ekaterina Makarova and Elena Vesnina.

Chan Yung-jan and Martina Hingis won the title, defeating Ashleigh Barty and Casey Dellacqua in the final, 6–3, 7–5.

Seeds

Draw

Draw

External links
 Main draw

Aegon Internationalandnbsp;- Doubles
2017 Women's Doubles